Guillaume Philippe Benoist (1725–70) was a French engraver, who spent the later part of his life in England.

Life
Benoist was born near Coutances, Normandy, in 1725. He lived in London during the later part of his life, and died there in 1770.  He engraved some portraits, and a few other subjects. Writing in the late 18th century, Joseph Strutt noted that "he chiefly confined himself to small plates, which he executed in a fine style, though with little taste."

Works
The following plates are by him:

Portraits
Galileo Galilei  after F. Villamena.
The President de Montesquieu.
Alexander Pope.
Rosen de Rosenstein, physician.
Sir Isaac Newton.
Blaise Pascal.
Albert Haller.
Mlle. Clairon, actress.
Jacques Andre Joseph Aved, painter  after Aved.

Subjects
Jupiter and Juno  after Giuliano di Parma.
Bathsheba bathing  after Bonnieu.

References

Sources

 

1725 births
1770 deaths
People from Coutances
18th-century engravers
French engravers